Eupithecia exudata is a moth in the family Geometridae first described by Pearsall in 1909. It is found in the eastern United States, including Pennsylvania, Indiana, Kentucky and Ohio.

The wingspan is about 15–16 mm. The forewings have a brownish tinge. There are a number of small, dark patches along the costa, a small dark discal dot and traces of a rather upright, darker median band and a whitish dot above the tornus. Adults are on wing in early spring.

References

Moths described in 1909
exudata
Moths of North America